Nureci is a comune (municipality) in the Province of Oristano in the Italian region Sardinia, located about  north of Cagliari and about  east of Oristano.

Nureci borders the following municipalities: Assolo, Genoni, Laconi, Senis.

Demographic evolution

References

Cities and towns in Sardinia